Beevan D'Mello (born 15 January 1987) is an Indian footballer who plays for Dempo.

Career

Early career
Raia based D'Mello was a part of Goa's successful Santosh Trophy winning team in 2009. He was with Salgaocar for ten years and before that started his youth career with Vasco.

D'Mello attended Deepvihar High School in Vasco da Gama and wanted to follow in the footsteps of his idol Bruno Coutinho. This dream turned into a reality in 2003 when he signed for Salgaocar and later represented Goa.

Salgaocar
D'Mello started his football career with Salgaocar S.C. in the I-League and scored his first goal for Salgaocar on 25 October 2009 against Sporting Clube de Goa.

In 2010, D'Mello suffered a serious cruciate ligament injury which saw him out on the sidelines for a long period.

Sporting Goa
D'mello signed to Sporting Clube de Goa in June 2013. He made his debut on 7 December 2013 against Dempo S.C. at the Fatorda Stadium in which he came on as a substitute for Rojen Singh in the 89th minute as Sporting Goa won the match 1–0.

References

External links
 Beevan D'Mello at Goal.com
 

People from Margao
Footballers from Goa
1987 births
Living people
Salgaocar FC players
I-League players
Sporting Clube de Goa players
Association football midfielders
Indian footballers